Bonus on Death (German: Prämien auf den Tod) is a 1950 Austrian crime film directed by Curd Jürgens and starring Judith Holzmeister, Werner Krauss and Siegfried Breuer. One of a handful of Austrian crime films made during the post-war period, it was not particularly successful at the box office.

The film's sets were designed by Isabella Schlichting and Werner Schlichting.

Synopsis
Short of money, a man creates a scam where he draws life insurance policies for fake identities, then pretends they have died in order to collect the payout.

Cast
 Judith Holzmeister as Evelyn Biaggi  
 Werner Krauss as Dr. Schmidt  
 Siegfried Breuer as Peter Lissen - Versicherungsagent  
 Felix Steinboeck as Kako, Klavierspieler  
 Curd Jürgens as Gunarson, Operntenor  
 Josef Meinrad as Matrose  
 Gisele Wilke as Cleo, Hafenwirtin  
 Edith Mill as Kellnerin  
 Melanie Horeschowsky as Tilla, Lissens Quartierfrau  
 Hermann Thimig as Muschel, Hafensinspektor  
 Karl Günther 
 Hermann Erhardt 
 Ilse Trenker 
 Gusti Wolf 
 Iván Petrovich
 Herta Baumann 
 Eugen Eisenlohr 
 Liselotte Gerhard 
 Hans Graff 
 Martha Hartmann 
 Friedrich Kutschera 
 Hans Mraschner 
 Mimi Stelzer 
 Ernst Therwal

References

Bibliography 
 Fritsche, Maria. Homemade Men in Postwar Austrian Cinema: Nationhood, Genre and Masculinity. Berghahn Books, 2013.

External links 
 

1950 films
1950 crime films
Austrian crime films
1950s German-language films
Films directed by Curd Jürgens
Austrian black-and-white films